The 2004 Canoe Slalom World Cup Race 1 - Men's K-1 was a Canoe Slalom race in Athens.

Men’s K1 Kayak Single

Results List - Heats - 1st and 2nd Run

Results List - Semi Final

Results List - SemiFinal and Final

References

External links 
 International Canoe Federation

Canoe Slalom World Cup
Canoe Slalom World Cup